The Hi-Fi Digimonster is an electronic device that can detonate a bomb. It was built for terrorists and designed for use in a terrorist plot in the United Kingdom.

References

Detonators